Cape Liptrap is located in south Gippsland, Victoria and is a peninsula that is the extension of the Hoddle Range that runs out to sea in a southwesterly direction. With a latitude of 38° 53' 60" S it the second most southerly point on the Australian mainland, just south of Cape Otway which lies to the west. Wilsons Promontory which is the most southerly point sits to the southeast separated from Cape Liptrap by Waratah Bay.

It was sighted by Lieutenant James Grant on 9 December 1800 from the survey brig HMS Lady Nelson and named after John Liptrap.

Cape Liptrap sits high above the Bass Strait with steep slopes and cliffs of folded marine sediments flanked by rock pinnacles and wave cut platforms.  At the end of the peninsula is Cape Liptrap Lighthouse that was built in 1951 in cast concrete, and is octagonal in shape.

Surrounding Townships
To the east of Cape Liptrap are the townships of Walkerville , Sandy Point  and Waratah Bay.

To the northwest is Venus Bay, the Tarwin River and the townships of Tarwin Lower, Inverloch and Wonthaggi.

Geography
Waratah Bay is located approximately 200km south east of Melbourne, Latitude 38° 54' 5" S, Longitude 145° 55' 4" E

References

External links
Cape Liptrap Locality Map
Parks Victoria: Cape Liptrap Coastal Park

Liptrap